The Drowned World is a 1962 science fiction novel by British writer J. G. Ballard. The novel depicts a post-apocalyptic future in which global warming caused by heightened solar radiation has rendered much of the Earth's surface uninhabitable. The story follows a team of scientists researching environmental developments in a flooded, abandoned London. The novel is an expansion of a novella of the same title first published in Science Fiction Adventures magazine in January 1962, Vol. 4, No. 24.

In 2010, Time Magazine named The Drowned World one of the top 10 best post-apocalyptic books. The novel has been identified as a founding text in the literary genre known as climate fiction.

Synopsis
In the mid 22nd Century, sudden violent and prolonged solar storms enlarge the Van Allen belts, leading to a deterioration of the Earth's ionosphere. Solar radiation bombards the planet, increasing temperatures, raising sea levels and imposing a tropical climate worldwide. With most of the planet no longer habitable for humans, the survivors migrate to the newly-hospitable poles.

In 2145, Dr Robert Kerans is part of a scientific survey unit under the leadership of Colonel Riggs sent to catalogue the flora and fauna of a lagoon located within what was once the city of London. The members of the expedition begin to experience strange dreams. Amidst talk of the army and scientific team moving north, Lieutenant Hardman, the only other commissioned member of the unit, flees the lagoon and instead heads south; a search team is unable to prevent his escape.

As the other inhabitants of the lagoon finally flee the searing sun and head north, Kerans and two associates, the reclusive Beatrice Dahl and fellow scientist Dr Alan Bodkin, opt to remain. A team of pirates, led by an individual named Strangman, arrives to loot treasures within the deep. When Strangman and his team drain the lagoon and expose the city beneath, both Kerans and Bodkin are disgusted; the latter attempts to blow up the flood defences and re-flood the area, but without success. With Kerans and Beatrice resigned to their fate, Strangman pursues Bodkin and kills him in revenge.

Strangman and his team grow suspicious of Kerans. He and Beatrice are imprisoned, while Kerans is then tortured. He survives, although severely weakened by the ordeal, and attempts to save Beatrice from her imprisonment, to little avail. With Kerans and Beatrice facing the guns of Strangman and his men, the army under Colonel Riggs returns to save them at the last moment. The authorities co-operate with Strangman rather than punish him and Kerans once more grows frustrated by the inaction, finally taking a stand and succeeding in re-flooding the lagoon where Bodkin had failed. 

Wounded and weak, Kerans flees the lagoon and heads south without aim, meeting the frail and blind figure of Hardman along the way. After he aids Hardman back to some amount of strength, he soon continues onwards on his travels south, "a second Adam searching for the forgotten paradises of the reborn sun".

Themes
As with many of Ballard's later works, the novel depicts characters who seize on apocalyptic or chaotic breakdowns in civilization as opportunities to pursue new modes of perception, unconscious urges, or systems of meaning.  
Writer Travis Eldborough stated that Ballard's work, and this novel in particular, allows us to "ask whether our sense of self—and of self as independent, sovereign, irrevocable—is itself a construction, and a temporary one."

Critic Brian Baker states that The Drowned World "explores the deep implications of time, space, psychology and evolutionary biology in order to dismantle anthropocentric narratives and, in turn, open up alternative ways of experiencing, and conceiving of, contemporary human subjectivity." Scholar Jim Clarke stated that in the novel and its 1966 successor The Crystal World, "Ballard's solitary protagonists traverse liminal states, often as psychological as physical, in which civilization recedes to the status of memory, and existence comes to be dominated and defined by the environment."

Reception
Following the novel's release, writer Kingsley Amis called Ballard "one of the brightest new stars in post-war fiction," and described the book as containing "an oppressive power reminiscent of Conrad."
Galaxy Science Fiction writer Algis Budrys mocked The Drowned World as "a run, hide, slither, grope and die book".

In a retrospective piece for The Telegraph, writer Will Self noted that Ballard's work was unappreciated during his life, and that following a critical reappraisal of his work, "The Drowned World shows him to be the most important British writer of the late 20th century." Writer Martin Amis states that "it is the measure of [Ballard's] creative radicalism that he welcomes these desperate dystopias with every atom of his being," but criticized the novel's perfunctory plotting, stating that "We conclude that Ballard is quite unstimulated by human interaction – unless it takes the form of something inherently weird, like mob atavism or mass hysteria. What excites him is human isolation."

References

Sources

 McCarthy, Patrick A., (1997). "Allusions in Ballard's The Drowned World", Science-Fiction Studies #72, 24:2, July, 302–10.
 Rossi, Umberto, (1994). "Images from the Disaster Area: An Apocalyptic Reading of Urban Landscapes in Ballard's The Drowned World and Hello America", Science-Fiction Studies #62, 21:1, March, 81–97.

External links
 
 

1962 British novels
1962 science fiction novels
Berkley Books books
British post-apocalyptic novels
Climate change novels
Novels by J. G. Ballard